Kim So-yeong may refer to:

Kim So-young (taekwondo) (born 1966), South Korean taekwondo practitioner
So Yong Kim (born 1968), South Korean-born American filmmaker
Fat Cat (singer) (born 1990), South Korean singer
Kim So-yeong (born 1992), South Korean badminton player